Tapinoma albinase is a species of ant in the genus Tapinoma. Described by Forel in 1910, the species is endemic to South Africa.

References

Tapinoma
Hymenoptera of Africa
Insects described in 1910